Sukhwinder Kumar is an Indian politician and a member of Shiromani Akali Dal. In 2017, he was elected as the member of the Punjab Legislative Assembly from Banga Assembly constituency.

Constituency
Kumar represents the Banga Assembly constituency. Kumar won the Banga Assembly constituency on a Shiromani Akali Dal ticket. Kumar beat the member of the Punjab Legislative Assembly, Harjot of the Aam Aadmi Party by over 1893 votes.

References

Punjab, India MLAs 2017–2022
Indian politicians
Living people
Year of birth missing (living people)